Changa is a blend of N,N-Dimethyltryptamine (DMT) mixed with a monoamine oxidase inhibitor (MAOI). The addition of MAOIs extend the DMT experience in duration and intensity when compared with smoking DMT freebase alone. Typically, extracts from DMT-containing plants are combined with a blend of different MAOI-containing herbs, such as the ayahuasca vine, and/or leaf or harmala alkaloids from Peganum harmala to create a mix that is 25 to 50% DMT.

History
Changa was created by an Australian in 2003-2004 and named when 'asked' for a moniker for the drug during an ayahuasca session. Changa was 'seeded' throughout the world, introducing it to the UK, Russia, India, Morocco, West Africa, Chile, Montenegro and China.

The substance grew in popularity from the mid 2000s. Its international introduction dates to the Boom Festival in Portugal in 2008. 

Changa's popularity has continued due to its ease of smoking, more powerful effects and longer duration (approximately 10-20 minutes) when compared to smoking freebase DMT crystal.

Composition
Changa consists of two primary components dimethyltryptamine  and monoamine oxidase inhibitors. 

Any number of blend combinations are possible. Doses vary substantially from one sample to the next depending on what ingredients are used and in what ratio. Some Changa samples can be more than 100 times stronger than others.

In popular culture 
Australian electronic trio Pnau titled their November 2017 album Changa in homage to the substance. It reached a peak of number 11 on the ARIA charts.

References
 
Ayahuasca
Polysubstance combinations
Entheogens
Psychedelic tryptamine carriers